John Cremeans is one of the first on-air home shopping hosts and is considered a pioneer in the home shopping industry.  From 1985 to 2020, Cremeans's span of 35 consecutive years as a national television host and guest is rivaled by only a few in electronic retailing with over 35,000 live television hours, over $2 billion dollars in sales and over 100,000 product presentations. Cremeans returned to HSN as a guest from 2012 through 2016, and has been a guest presenter on EVINE, QVC UK, QVC Italy and HSE24 Germany.

Career
Cremeans accomplishments have taken him to television shopping networks that have included America's Value Network, CVN - The Cable Value Network, HSN, EVINE, QVC UK and HSE24 in Germany. In 2014 the Electronic Retailing Association, at their annual Moxies Awards, honored John by naming him the Best Product Expert in direct response worldwide. He also co-hosted a nationally syndicated invention and innovation radio show, My Cool Inventions, from 2012 to 2018 and created the digital streaming channel, Inventions and Gadgets, which airs live programming 24/7 on Roku TV, Amazon FireTV, Android TV, Facebook Live and Youtube. Cremeans also helped in the development and establishment of America's Talk Radio Network which helped to syndicate over 30 radio shows nationally from 2014 to 2016.

His most popular television shows were CVN's SoldOutrageous where Cremeans and his late night band of characters took to the airwaves to sell anything from gold to electronics and HSN's Sunrise Morning Show where he cohosted with Lynn Murphy. His moniker "The Doctor of Shopology" was given to him by a caller during his early days as a host.

His broadcast career started while he was a senior in high school when he worked at a local radio station - WIXK & WIXK-FM in New Richmond, Wisconsin doing part-time night and weekend announcing. He later worked in talk radio at WRPX in Hudson, Wisconsin just outside the twin cities of Minneapolis–Saint Paul. He was promoted to news director at both stations and later became the station manager at WRPX.

Television and sports celebrities John Cremeans has worked with:
William Shatner, Stan Lee, Fran Tarkenton, Jack Palance, Olivia Newton-John, Didi Conn, Omar Sharif, Reggie White, James Doohan, Mimi Rogers, Richard Petty, Kyle Petty, Florence Henderson, Ed McMahon, Frankie Avalon, Mr. T, Suzanne Somers, Wolfgang Puck, Rhonda Shear, Stephanie Seymour, Vanna White, Ivana Trump, Franco Harris, John Tesh, Connie Sellecca, Mannheim Steamroller, Tony Robbins, Connie Stevens, Louise Mandrell.

References

Finding the Next Great Inventor Forbes
My Cool Inventions Searching for Next Million Dollar Product PRWeb
2014 Electronic Retailing Association's Moxie Award Winners Retailing.Org

American television personalities
Male television personalities
Living people
Year of birth missing (living people)